The Oroville Red Sox were a minor league baseball team that operated in 1948 as part of the Class-D Far West League. They were based in Oroville, California and played at Mitchell Field as an affiliate of the Boston Red Sox. The team was managed by Nino Bongiovanni.

External links
 Baseball Reference

Defunct Far West League teams
Boston Red Sox minor league affiliates
Professional baseball teams in California
1948 establishments in California
1948 disestablishments in California
Baseball teams established in 1948
Sports clubs disestablished in 1948
Sports in Oroville, California
Sports in Butte County, California
Defunct baseball teams in California
Baseball teams disestablished in 1948
Far West League teams